Spathia is a genus of plants in the grass family. The only known species is Spathia neurosa, native to northern Australia (Queensland, Northern Territory, and Western Australia).

References

Andropogoneae
Monotypic Poaceae genera
Endemic flora of Australia